Archaeologia Polona is an academic journal of  archaeology published in English annually since 1958 by the Institute of Archaeology and Ethnology of the Polish Academy of Sciences. The journal focuses on contemporary archaeology with particular respect to Poland.

See also  
 Prehistory and protohistory of Poland

External links 
 
 Archive

References

Archaeology journals
Polish Academy of Sciences academic journals
Publications established in 1958
Annual journals
English-language journals